Tudela may refer to:

Tudela, Navarre, a town and municipality in northern Spain
 Benjamin of Tudela Medieval Jewish traveller 
 William of Tudela, Medieval troubadour who wrote the first part of the Song of the Albigensian Crusade
 Battle of Tudela (1808), part of the Peninsular War
Tudela, Cebu, a municipality in the Philippine province of Cebu 
Tudela, Misamis Occidental, a municipality in the Philippine province of Misamis Occidental
João Maria Tudela (1929–2011), Portuguese singer and entertainer
Josh Tudela (born 1984), professional soccer player for the Los Angeles Galaxy